P. fenestrata may refer to:
 Phasia fenestrata, Bigot, 1889, a tachinid fly species
 Pipiza fenestrata, Meigen, 1822, a hoverfly species
 Platypleura fenestrata, Uhler, 1862, a bug species
 Pleomeliola fenestrata, a fungus species
 Pterocalla fenestrata, a species of picture-winged fly
 Pterocerina fenestrata, a species of picture-winged fly

See also
 Fenestrata (disambiguation)